Kukule Ganga is a river in Sabaragamuwa Province in southwestern Sri Lanka. The Kukule Ganga Dam and reservoir lies along the river. The Kukule Ganga Dam has been built to generate electricity by using this river and has basin area of 120 miles², an annual average rainfall of 150in and annual water yield of 735,000 acre feet.

References 

Rivers of Sri Lanka
Bodies of water of Sabaragamuwa Province